Aschiphasmatidae are a family of stick insects belonging to the suborder Verophasmatodea; they can be found in Indomalaya.

Tribes and genera
These genera all belong to the subfamily Aschiphasmatinae, placed in two tribes:

Aschiphasmatini
Authority: Brunner von Wattenwyl, 1893

 Abrosoma Redtenbacher, 1906
 Anoplobistus Bragg, 2001
 Aschiphasma Westwood, 1834
 Chlorobistus Bragg, 2001
 Coloratobistus Zompro, 2004
 Dallaiphasma Gottardo, 2011
 Dinophasma Uvarov, 1940
 Duocornubistus Seow-Choen, 2017
 Eurybistus Bragg, 2001
 Kerabistus Bragg, 2001
 Leurophasma Bi, 1995
 Ommatopseudes Günther, 1942
 Orthomeria Kirby, 1904
 Parabrosoma Giglio-Tos, 1910
 Parorthomeria Bragg, 2006
 Pectodajaca Seow-Choen, 2018
 Presbistus Kirby, 1896
 Yongtsuius Bragg, 2001

Dajacini
Monotypic, authority: Bragg, 2001
 Dajaca Brunner von Wattenwyl, 1893

References

Further reading

External links 

Phasmatodea families
Phasmatodea of Asia